Mihkel Mattisen (born 13 August 1976, in Tallinn) is an Estonian pianist, pop singer, songwriter, music producer and teacher.

He studied piano at Tallinn Music High School. From 1994 to 2000 he continued to study piano at Estonian Academy of Music and Theatre.

He is the author of the song "So There Can be a New Beginning" which was sung by Birgit Õigemeel during Eurovision Song Contest 2013.

He was a member for the band Jam (1994–2005), and for the pop-ensemble Swingers. He was a pianist in television series "Tähed muusikas" ('Stars in Music').

He started teaching at Kadrina Secondary school (Kadrina Keskkool) in September of 2020.

References

Estonian pianists
20th-century Estonian male singers
Estonian pop singers
21st-century Estonian male singers
Estonian Academy of Music and Theatre alumni
People from Tallinn
Living people
1976 births